Nsima Peter (born 28 December 1988) is a Nigerian football player who plays as a striker for Romanian club AFC Unirea Slobozia.

Club career
Peter's mother club was Wikki Tourists FC. In 2011 he came to Sweden and Kristianstad. In the first match that he started he scored a hat-trick against Oddevold. On 29 September 2012, he again scored a hat-trick, this time against Karlstad in a match that ended with a 3-1 win for KFF.

In February 2013, he signed a three-year contract with Varberg. In December 2016, Peter was recruited by Frej, where he signed a one-year contract with an option for another year.
On 18 November 2018, Peter was recruited by Falkenberg, where he signed a two-year contract. On 13 April 2019 he made his debut in the Allsvenskan for Falkenbergs against Häcken.

On 16 February 2022, Peter signed with Utsikten in Superettan.

In January 2023 Peter signed for Romanian club AFC Unirea Slobozia.

References

1988 births
Living people
Nigerian footballers
Association football forwards
Kristianstad FC players
Varbergs BoIS players
IK Frej players
Falkenbergs FF players
Akhisarspor footballers
Utsiktens BK players
Ettan Fotboll players
Superettan players
Allsvenskan players
TFF First League players
Nigerian expatriate footballers
Expatriate footballers in Sweden
Nigerian expatriate sportspeople in Sweden
Expatriate footballers in Turkey
Nigerian expatriate sportspeople in Turkey
Expatriate footballers in Romania
Nigerian expatriate sportspeople in Romania